Dowden's Luck is a historic house located at Poolesville, Montgomery County, Maryland, United States. The main house is a -story, late Federal-style frame house. Major additions were made in 1855 and 1910. Also on the property are a one-story gable-roofed stone slave quarters, a one-story gable-roofed brick smokehouse, a stone spring house, and the foundations of two barns, all built during the 1824-1850 plantation period. An overgrown terraced garden in its original configuration as constructed around 1855 stands to the west of the house. Dowden's Luck was listed on the National Register of Historic Places in 1988.

References

External links

, including photo in 1986, at Maryland Historical Trust website

African-American history of Montgomery County, Maryland
Houses completed in 1824
Houses in Montgomery County, Maryland
Houses on the National Register of Historic Places in Maryland
Federal architecture in Maryland
Plantation houses in Maryland
National Register of Historic Places in Montgomery County, Maryland
Slave cabins and quarters in the United States